In numerical analysis, the ITP method, short for Interpolate Truncate and Project, is the first root-finding algorithm that achieves the superlinear convergence of the secant method while retaining the optimal worst-case performance of the bisection method. It is also the first method with guaranteed average performance strictly better than the bisection method under any continuous distribution. In practice it performs better than traditional interpolation and hybrid based strategies (Brent's Method, Ridders, Illinois), since it not only converges super-linearly over well behaved functions but also guarantees fast performance under ill-behaved functions where interpolations fail.

The ITP method follows the same structure of standard bracketing strategies that keeps track of upper and lower bounds for the location of the root; but it also keeps track of the region where worst-case performance is kept upper-bounded.  As a bracketing strategy, in each iteration the ITP queries the value of the function on one point and discards the part of the interval between two points where the function value shares the same sign. The queried point is calculated with three steps: it interpolates finding the regula falsi estimate, then it perturbes/truncates the estimate (similar to  ) and then projects the perturbed estimate onto an interval in the neighbourhood of the bisection midpoint. The neighbourhood around the bisection point is calculated in each iteration in order to guarantee minmax optimality (Theorem 2.1 of ). The method depends on three hyper-parameters  and  where  is the golden ratio : the first two control the size of the truncation and the third is a slack variable that controls the size of the interval for the projection step.

Root finding problem 

And, given a pre-specified target precision , a root-finding algorithm is designed to solve the following problem with the least amount of queries as possible:Problem Definition: Find  such that  , where  satisfies .

This problem is very common in numerical analysis, computer science and engineering; and, root-finding algorithms are the standard approach to solve it. Often, the root-finding procedure is called by more complex parent algorithms within a larger context, and, for this reason solving root problems efficiently is of extreme importance since an inefficient approach might come at a high computational cost when the larger context is taken into account. This is what the ITP method attempts to do by simultaneously exploiting interpolation guarantees as well as minmax optimal guarantees of the bisection method that terminates in at most   iterations when initiated on an interval .

The method 

Given ,   and   where  is the golden ratio , in each iteration   the ITP method calculates the point  following three steps:

 [Projection Step] Project the estimator to minmax interval:  where .
The value of the function  on this point is queried, and the interval is then reduced to bracket the root by keeping the sub-interval with function values of opposite sign on each end.

The algorithm 
 Input:  
     While
   
         Calculating Parameters:
         Interpolation:
             ;
         Truncation:
             ;
             If  then ,
             Else ;
         Projection:
             If  then ,
             Else ;
         Updating Interval:
             ;
             ;
 Output:

Example: Finding the root of a polynomial 
Suppose that the ITP method is used to find a root of the polynomial  Using  and  we find that:

The ITP method required less than half the number of iterations than the bisection to obtain a more precise estimate of the root with no cost on the minmax guarantees. Other methods might also attain a similar speed of convergence (such as Ridders, Brent etc.) but without the minmax guarantees given by the ITP method.

Analysis 
The main advantage of the ITP method is that it is guaranteed to require no more iterations than the bisection method when . And so its average performance is guaranteed to be better than the bisection method even when interpolation fails. Furthermore, if interpolations do not fail (smooth functions), then it is guaranteed to enjoy the high order of convergence as interpolation based methods.

Worst case performance 
Because the ITP method projects the estimator onto the minmax interval with a  slack, it will require at most  iterations (Theorem 2.1 of ). This is minmax optimal like the bisection method when  is chosen to be .

Average performance 
Because it does not take more than  iterations, the average number of iterations will always be less than that of the bisection method for any distribution considered when  (Corollary 2.2 of ).

Asymptotic performance 

See also 

 Bisection method
 Ridders' method
 Regula falsi
 Brent's method

Notes

References

External links 

 An Improved Bisection Method, by Kudos

Root-finding algorithms